Weerasangilige Wimal Weerawansa (born 7 March 1970) is a Sri Lankan politician, Member of Parliament and current leader of the National Freedom Front (NFF). Weerawansa has served many cabinet positions, including Minister of Industries from 2020 to 2022, Minister of Small and Medium Business and Enterprise Development, Industries and Supply Chain Management from 2019 to 2020, Minister of Housing and Social Welfare in 2018 and the Minister of Construction and Housing from 2010 to 2015.

Early life and family
Weerawanssa was born 7 March 1970. He is the son of Weerasangilige Podineris, a dancing teacher and professional musician, and Wadachcharige Salie. Weerawansha has one brother (Sarath Weerawansha) and three sisters (Weerasangilige Sumanawathie, Chandani Weerawansha and Nilani Weerawansha). Weerawansha was educated at Tissa Central College in Kalutara where he played for the school cricket team. Weerawansha passed eight GCE O levels and started studying GCE A level but was expelled for not attending classes.

Weerawansa is married to Ranasinghe Mudiyanselage Shirsha Udayanthi (Sashi). They have a son (Wibhuthi Wishwajith Weerawansha) and a daughter (Wimasha Wishwadari).

Career
Weerawansa joined the Janatha Vimukthi Peramuna (JVP) during its second insurrection and wrote articles in Lakdiva and Hiru, pro-JVP periodicals. He was known by various aliases including Wimalasiri Gamlath and Wanshanatha. He was president of the Peoples' Movement for Freedom (Nidahasa Udesa Janatha Viyaparaya), propaganda secretary and politburo member of the JVP. In his early political years Weerawansha was greatly influenced by socialism and disliked nationalism as much as capitalism. He even accused the ultra-nationalist National Movement Against Terrorism (NMAT) of orchestrating a coup d'état. However, as time went by, Weerawansa and the JVP slowly began to move away from Marxism and towards Sinhalese nationalism.

Weerawansa was one of the Sri Lanka Progressive Front (a JVP-led front) candidates in Colombo District at the 1994 parliamentary election, but the SLPF failed to win any seats in the district. He contested the 1997 local government election as a JVP candidate and was elected to the Colombo Municipal Council. He contested the 1999 provincial council election as one of the JVP's candidates in Colombo District, and as the JVP's chief minister candidate, but failed to get elected. The JVP nevertheless appointed Weerawansa to the Western Provincial Council. Weerawansa contested the 2000 parliamentary election as one of the JVP's candidates in Colombo District. He was elected and entered Parliament. He was re-elected at the 2001 parliamentary election.

Weerawansha played key roles in the JVP's opposition to President Chandrika Kumaratunga's devolution plans and the Norwegian facilitated peace talk with the militant Liberation Tigers of Tamil Eelam. On 20 January 2004, the Sri Lanka Freedom Party (SLFP) and the JVP got together to form the United People's Freedom Alliance (UPFA). Weerawansa was one of the UPFA's candidates in Colombo District at the 2004 parliamentary election and was re-elected. In June 2005, the JVP left the UPFA government. Weerawansha was general-secretary of the Patriotic National Movement (PNM).

Weerawansha fell out with the leadership of JVP and was suspended from the party in March 2008, on accusations of corruption, espionage and extra-marital affairs. In May 2008, several dissident JVP MPs led by Weerawansa formed the National Freedom Front (NFF) (or the Jathika Nidahas Peramuna). The NFF joined the UPFA government in December 2008. Weerawansa was re-elected at the 2010 parliamentary election. He was appointed Minister of Construction, Engineering Services, Housing and Common Amenities after the election. He lost his ministerial position following the January 2015 presidential election. He was re-elected at the August 2015 parliamentary election. Weerawansha was appointed as the Minister of Small & Medium Business and Enterprise Development, Industries and Supply chain Management in November 2019 following the 2019 presidential election.

Weerawansa was appointed as Minister of Industries in 2020 under Gotabaya Rajapaksa, but was later stripped of his ministerial portfolios on 3 March, 2022.

On 4 September 2022, after defecting from the ruling Sri Lanka People's Freedom Alliance, Weerawansa founded the Supreme Lanka Coalition along with seven other small leftist and nationalist parties. In January 2023, the SLC formed the Freedom People's Alliance with the SLFP and the Freedom People's Congress.

Controversies
Weerawansa has been involved in numerous controversies during his career. In 2006 he was accused of sexually harassing a 24-year-old female employee of the state-owned Lake House. On 8 July 2010 Weerawansha began a hunger strike outside the United Nations office in Colombo to protest against the appointment of the Panel of Experts on Accountability in Sri Lanka by the Secretary-General of the United Nations Ban Ki-moon. Despite promising to "fast-unto-death" Weerawansha's hunger strike only lasted until 10 July 2010 and was seen as a publicity stunt. In March 2012 Weerawansha called for Sri Lankans to boycott American products such as Coca-Cola, Pepsi, KFC, McDonald's, Google and Gmail as a protest against the US government sponsoring a resolution on Sri Lanka at the United Nations Human Rights Council.

Following the change in government in January 2015 the police started investigating Weerawansha's wife Shashi over allegations that she faked official documents to obtain a diplomatic passport. A panel investigating the activities of the housing ministry during Weerawansha's ministry uncovered financial irregularities and rampant nepotism. Weerawansha was investigated by the Financial Crimes Investigation Division (FCID) over how several of his relatives obtained government constructed houses at well below market prices. Weerawansha was arrested at Bandaranaike International Airport on 23 October 2015 due to discrepancies in his passport. After being questioned by the Criminal Investigation Department, he was produced before Negombo Magistrate's Court and released on bail. Weerawana was arrested by the Police Financial Crimes Financial Crimes Investigations Division (FCID) on accusations of misusing government vehicles on 10 January 2017. Weerawansha's bail applications were rejected several times. While he was in custody, Weerawansha started a hunger strike claiming of political revenge by the government. The hunger strike was called off after eight days on requests made by Theras of the Malwathu and Asgiri chapters and fellow politicians. Weerawansha was released on bail on 7 April 2017.

Weerawansha has been accused of spreading communalism.

Weerawansha asked the public to launch a Black Flag protest to oppose the Indian Prime Minister Narendra Modi during his visit to Sri Lanka in 2017 May.

In October 2017, Weerawansha stated that the parliament should be bombed if a new constitution was  approved by a parliament vote. The Parliament Speaker urged to inquire into Weerawansha's statement. Piyasiri Wijenayake, an NFF member criticized Weerawansha and claimed that the thoughts expressed were Weerawansha's personal views.

In May 2022, Weerawansa's wife, Shashi was sentenced to two years in prison after she was found guilty of obtaining passport by submitting false information.

Electoral history

Notes

References

External links

 wimalweerawansa.lk Official website

1970 births
Colombo municipal councillors
Housing ministers of Sri Lanka
Janatha Vimukthi Peramuna politicians
Jathika Nidahas Peramuna politicians
Sinhalese nationalists
Living people
Members of the 11th Parliament of Sri Lanka
Members of the 12th Parliament of Sri Lanka
Members of the 13th Parliament of Sri Lanka
Members of the 14th Parliament of Sri Lanka
Members of the 15th Parliament of Sri Lanka
Members of the 16th Parliament of Sri Lanka
Members of the Western Provincial Council
Sinhalese politicians
Sri Lankan Buddhists
United People's Freedom Alliance politicians